San Pa Tong is a district (amphoe) of Chiang Mai province in northern Thailand.

Geography
Neighboring districts are (from the southwest clockwise) Doi Lo, Mae Wang, Hang Dong of Chiang Mai Province, Mueang Lamphun and Pa Sang of Lamphun province.

History
Originally named Ban Mae, it was renamed San Pa Tong in 1939.

The remains of an ancient walled town of the Haripunchai Kingdom, Wiang Tha Kan, founded approximately 1,000 years ago, lie in the southern part of this district, in tambon Ban Klang.

Administration
The district is divided into 11 sub-districts (tambons), which are further subdivided into 122 villages (mubans). There are three sub-district municipalities (thesaban tambons): San Pa Tong covers parts of tambons Yu Wa, Makham Luang, and Thung Tom; and Ban Klang which covers parts of Ban Klang, Tha Wang Phrao, Makham Luang, and Ma Khun Wan. The area of Thung Tom sub-district not covered by San Pa Thong municipality also forms a sub-district municipality. There are a further 10 tambon administrative organizations (TAO), covering the non-municipal areas of each sub-district.

Missing numbers are tambons which now form Mae Wang district.

References

External links
amphoe.com

San Pa Tong